The Bortelhorn (also known as Punta del Rebbio) is a mountain of the Lepontine Alps on the Swiss-Italian border. On its west side it overlooks the Gantertal.

References

External links
 Bortelhorn on Hikr

Mountains of the Alps
Alpine three-thousanders
Mountains of Switzerland
Mountains of Piedmont
Italy–Switzerland border
International mountains of Europe
Mountains of Valais
Lepontine Alps